Jaílson Alexandre Alves dos Santos (born 16 June 1981), or simply Jaílson, is a Brazilian former football attacking midfielder or striker.

Career
Born in Caruaru, Jáilson spent his youth years at Porto de Caruaru. Afterwards he played for Santa Cruz, Sport, Vitória de Guimarães, among others. In 2006, he arrived at Paulista, and had his breakthrough season, scoring 17 goals in the 2006 Campeonato Brasileiro Série B. That performance attracted interest of Corinthians, who signed him in December 2006. However, despite a good start, which included a double against São Bento, in late February, Corinthians opted to loan him to Russian team Rubin Kazan until November.

Six months later, Jaílson was in Portugal, signing a four-year contract with Benfica and being immediately loaned to Braga. He was used as a back-up to Roland Linz, coming off the bench on all but three appearances, scoring four goals. After the season ended, his former manager at Braga, Manuel Machado, in transit to Nacional, requested that Benfica loaned him again. Nevertheless, in July 2008, Jaílson returned to Brazil to sign with Coritiba. He spent six months there, moving to Atlético Goianiense in 2009. His time in Goianiense was short and in July 2009, he returned to Portugal to play for Olhanense. Less than a month later, he was released because of physical problems. His next stop was Cyprus, playing for Ermis Aradippou for the remainder of the season.

Back to Portugal in 2010, Jaílson was an important player for Vitória de Setúbal in 2010–11, scoring four goals, the last two earned the club six points that helped them escape relegation. He did not renew his contract with Setúbal and was without team until January 2012, when he joined Boa. A month later, he terminated his contract with Boa. In March 2012, Jáilson joined Fortaleza, staying there until September 2013, scoring 23 goals.

After Fortaleza, he played three months at Icasa, before moving to Treze, where he played in 2014. Following a two-year spell at Central, Jáilson returned to Paulista in February 2015, staying there for eleven months, until signing with Sergipe.

References

External links
 
 

1981 births
People from Caruaru
Living people
Brazilian footballers
Brazilian expatriate footballers
Clube Atlético do Porto players
Santa Cruz Futebol Clube players
Marília Atlético Clube players
Sport Club do Recife players
Vitória S.C. players
Clube de Regatas Brasil players
Associação Atlética Caldense players
Paulista Futebol Clube players
Sport Club Corinthians Paulista players
FC Rubin Kazan players
S.L. Benfica footballers
S.C. Braga players
Coritiba Foot Ball Club players
Atlético Clube Goianiense players
S.C. Olhanense players
Ermis Aradippou FC players
Vitória F.C. players
Fortaleza Esporte Clube players
Associação Desportiva Recreativa e Cultural Icasa players
Treze Futebol Clube players
Club Sportivo Sergipe players
Russian Premier League players
Primeira Liga players
Cypriot First Division players
Expatriate footballers in Russia
Expatriate footballers in Portugal
Expatriate footballers in Cyprus
Association football forwards
Association football midfielders
Sportspeople from Pernambuco